Harish Chandra Shukla (born 16 March 1940), better known by his pen name Kaak, is an Indian editorial cartoonist and caricaturist who works in Hindi-language media. He is the foremost Hindi newspaper cartoonist, having worked with leading newspapers such as Jansatta, Navbharat Times, Dainik Jagran, Rajasthan Patrika, and a few others, in a career spanning several decades. 'Kaak' means crow in Hindi, which according to a proverb, is the bird that raises its raucous voice when someone tells a lie.

Biography

Kaak was born 16 March 1940, at village Pura, Unnao, Uttar Pradesh, the son of a freedom fighter. He trained to work as a mechanical engineer, but gave up the field to pursue cartooning. His first cartoon was published in Dainik Jagran in 1967. He has worked as an editorial cartoonist with Jansatta (Indian Express group) from 1983 to 1985 and with Navbharat Times (Times of India group) from July 1985 to Jan 1999. He has also been published in Dinman, Shankar's Weekly, Current, Blitz, Ravivar, Itwari Patrika, Dharamyug, and Saptahik Hindustan. National Hindi dailies such as Dainik Jagran, Aaj, Navjeevan, Rajasthan Patrika, and Amar Ujala have carried his work. At present he contributes to the webportal Prabhasakshi.

He was also Elected as the first president of Cartoonists' Club of India.

Kaak is very commonly called as the Cartoonist of masses, adding that his greatness lies in his brilliant understanding of the problems of the people at the grassroots level. Yet, unlike Laxman’s Common Man, Kaak’s Everyman is not a silent spectator to the goings-on. He is a vocal commentator. Kaak’s female characters too are strong characters.

Awards and honors
 Honored with "Kaka Hathrasi Samman" by Hindi Academy Delhi: 2003 
 Honored by Kerala Lalit Kala Academy and Kerala Cartoon Academy during cartoon camp at Ernakulam (Kochi): 2009
 Felicitated with Lifetime Achievement Award by Indian Institute of Cartoonists, Bangalore : 2009 
 Felicitated with Lifetime Achievement Award by Dr. A. P. J. Abdul Kalam at Cartoon Festival, New Delhi, under the auspices of Cartoon Watch: 2011 
 National Award for the excellence in journalism, 2016; organised by Press Council of India: 2017

Books

Nazariya, a collection of selected cartoons from at day to day issues, compiled by Vinod Bhardwaj, Published by Rupa & Co. : 1989 
Kargil Kartoons, During Kargil War, with a support of the cartoons of seven other leading cartoonists, a collection of cartoons dedicated to the Indian defense forces: 1999 
Laugh as you Travel, on the occasion of completing 150 glorious years of Indian Railways a collection of 50 cartoons made by Kaak and Shekhar Gurera : 2000

Reception
 Like Charlie Brown, ultimately the appeal of Kaak's persona, lies in his ability to laugh and feel ashamed at human folly : Mrinal Pandey (Editor-in-chief Dainik Hindustan, Hindustan Times Publications) 
 I am speaker of Loksabha (Parliament) merely with five hundred members, while Kaak is speaker of Loksabha with members in millions : Balram Jakhar (Speaker of Lok Sabha, 16 Dec. 1986, Public Honour in Haridwar)

References

Indian cartoonists
Indian editorial cartoonists
Indian caricaturists
People from Unnao
1940 births
Living people
Pseudonymous artists